The 2020–21 Beşiktaş J.K. season was the club's 117th season in existence and the club's 61st consecutive season in the top flight of Turkish football. In addition to the domestic league, Beşiktaş participated in this season's editions of the Turkish Cup, the UEFA Champions League, and the UEFA Europa League. This season covered the period from 1 August 2020 to 30 June 2021.

Season events
On 1 August, Lille announced the signing of Burak Yılmaz.

On 12 August, Beşiktaş announced the signing of Fabrice N'Sakala to a one-year contract, from Alanyaspor.

On 17 August, Beşiktaş announced the signing of Bernard Mensah on a one-year loan deal from Kayserispor.

On 20 August, Beşiktaş announced the signing of Welinton to a one-year contract, from Alanyaspor.

On 28 August, Beşiktaş announced the signing of Atakan Üner from Altınordu.

On 2 September, Javi Montero joined Beşiktaş on a season-long loan deal from Atlético Madrid. 

On 3 September, the Turkish Football Federation announced that all games during the first half of the Süper Lig season, would be played behind closed doors due to the COVID-19 pandemic in Turkey.

On 7 September, Enzo Roco moved to Fatih Karagümrük.

On 14 September, Beşiktaş announced the signing of Josef de Souza from Al-Ahli.

On 18 September, Beşiktaş announced the return of Gökhan Töre from Yeni Malatyaspor.

On 26 September, Beşiktaş announced the return of Vincent Aboubakar from Porto.

On 2 October, Beşiktaş announced the signing of Valentin Rosier on a season-long loan deal from Sporting CP.

On 5 October, Beşiktaş announced the signing of Rachid Ghezzal on a season-long loan deal from Leicester City.

On 1 February, Beşiktaş announced the return of Cenk Tosun on loan for the remainder of the season, and the permanent signing of Bilal Ceylan. Also on the same day Jeremain Lens, Tyler Boyd, Erdoğan Kaya and Güven Yalçın all the left the club on loan, whilst Nicolas Isimat-Mirin's contract was terminated by mutual consent.

Squad

Out on loan

Transfers

In

Loans in

Out

Loans out

Released

Friendlies

Competitions

Overview

Süper Lig

League table

Results summary

Results by round

Matches

Turkish Cup

UEFA Champions League

Qualifying rounds

UEFA Europa League

Qualifying rounds

Squad statistics

Appearances and goals

|-
|colspan="14"|Players out on loan:

|-
|colspan="14"|Players who left Beşiktaş during the season:
|}

Goal scorers

Clean sheets

Disciplinary Record

References

External links

Beşiktaş J.K. seasons
Beşiktaş J.K.
Turkish football championship-winning seasons
Beşiktaş
Beşiktaş